Volodymyr Mitin (born 1937) is a former Soviet cyclist. He competed in the team pursuit event at the 1956 Summer Olympics.

References

External links
 

1937 births
Living people
Soviet male cyclists
Olympic cyclists of the Soviet Union
Cyclists at the 1956 Summer Olympics
Place of birth missing (living people)